Avi Soffer (born 29 March 1986) is an Israeli football player. He currently plays for Hapoel Ramat Gan.

References

1986 births
Living people
Israeli Jews
Israeli footballers
Beitar Nes Tubruk F.C. players
Hapoel Tel Aviv F.C. players
Hapoel Ra'anana A.F.C. players
Hapoel Ramat Gan F.C. players
Hapoel Nir Ramat HaSharon F.C. players
Hapoel Kfar Saba F.C. players
Israeli Premier League players
Liga Leumit players
Israeli people of Turkish-Jewish descent
Footballers from Central District (Israel)
Association football defenders